Michael Apostolius (in Constantinople – after 1474 or 1486, possibly in Venetian Crete) or Apostolius Paroemiographus, i.e. Apostolius the proverb-writer, was a Greek teacher, writer and copyist who lived in the fifteenth century.

Life 
When, in 1453, the Turks conquered Constantinople, his native city, he fled to Italy, and there obtained the protection of Cardinal Bessarion. But engaging in the great dispute that then raged between the upholders of Aristotle and Plato, his zeal for the latter led him to speak so contemptuously of the more popular philosopher and of his defender, Theodorus Gaza, that he fell under the severe displeasure of his patron.

He afterwards retired to Crete, then a Venetian colony, where he earned a scanty living by teaching and by copying manuscripts. Many of his copies are still to be found in the libraries of Europe. One of them, the Icones of Philostratus at Bologna, bears the inscription: "The king of the poor of this world has written this book for his living."

Apostolius died about 1480, leaving a son, Arsenius Apostolius, who became bishop of Malvasia (Monemvasia) in the Morea.

Writings 
Of his numerous works a few have been printed:
Παροιμίαι (Paroemiae, Greek for "proverbs"), a collection of proverbs in Greek
 an edition published in Basel in 1538, now exceedingly rare
 a fuller edition edited by Daniel Heinsius ("Curante Heinsio") and published in Leiden in 1619
"Oratio Panegyrica ad Fredericum III." in Freher's Scriptores Rerum Germanicarum, vol. ii. (Frankfort, 1624)
Georgii Gemisthi Plethonis et Mich. Apostolii Orationes funebres duae in quibus de Immortalitate Animae exponitur (Leipzig, 1793)
a work against the Latin Church and the council of Florence in Le Moine's Varia Sacra.

See also
Greek scholars in the Renaissance

Notes

References 
 

1420s births
1480 deaths
15th-century Byzantine people
15th-century Greek people
Greek theologians
Greek Renaissance humanists
People from Constantinople
Year of birth uncertain
Kingdom of Candia
15th-century Greek writers
15th-century Greek educators